This article is a list of the episodes of the Japanese anime series Phantom: Requiem for the Phantom, which is animated by Bee Train and directed by Koichi Mashimo under the Project Phantom group. The series went on air on April 2, 2009 on TV Tokyo. Subsequently, the show also aired on AT-X, TV Aichi, and TV Osaka. FUNimation Entertainment is streaming the series for its North American audience.

The anime is based on the 2000 video game Phantom of Inferno.

The series is about a Japanese national who gets kidnapped by an assassin syndicate called Inferno after he had personally witnessed an assassination while visiting the United States. Inferno is a criminal organization attempting to unite all known underworld mob gangs into one conglomerate.  In order to achieve their goal, Inferno deploys its assassin operatives codenamed Phantom. Among them is an amnesiac girl named Ein and the Japanese national, who was given the name Zwei as his codename after being brainwashed of his previous memory.

An announcement regarding the show was first announced in the January issue of Kadokawa Shoten's Newtype magazine with Yoshimitsu Yamashita, Mutsumi Sasaki and Yoko Kikuchi being the main animators with Bee Train being in charge of animation. Soon afterwards, a promotional video of Phantom: Requiem for the Phantom was broadcast on Biglobe. Music for the series is created under Masumi Itō, using the alias Hikaru Nanase. For the first 19 episodes, the opening song "Karma" is written and sung by Kokia and arranged by Hikaru Nanase, with the ending song  is sung by Ali Project with CD singles released. From episode 20 onwards, a 2nd opening song  is sung by Ali Project with a 2nd ending song "Transparent" written and sung by Kokia and also arranged by Nanase. In addition, the OST of the show with CD singles by Ayahi Takagaki and Miyu Irino have been released to the public on July 8, 2009.

The Japanese DVD releases of Volume 1 came out on July 24, 2009 with subsequent releases from Volumes 2 to 10 on August 25, 2009, September 25, 2009, October 23, 2009, November 25, 2009, December 22, 2009, January 22, 2010, February 25, 2010, March 25, 2010 and April 23, 2010.  FUNimation released the series on Blu-ray and DVD in 2011.  
A manga adaptation of the show was published in tankōbon form on May 23, 2009 by Media Factory and Nitroplus, with the manga being illustrated by Masaki Hiragi under Media Factory's Monthly Comic Alives February issue.

Episodes

Original soundtracks

Two original soundtracks featuring Hikaru Nanase's score were released in 2009.  Both albums featured the TV cut of the opening and ending themes by Kokia and Ali Project.  Koichi Mashimo executive produced the album and Nanase's husband Yoshiyuki Ito acted as the music producer.  Album two also features the instrumental version of the Zwei image song "Haitoku no Gajou" written by Tatsuya Kato.

Track List

Volume 1
All tracks by Hikaru Nanase except where noted.

Requiem for the Phantom Part I
Struggle for Zero
Assassin
Blissout
To Kill or Not to Kill
Haste and Pursuit
Canzone of Death Part II
To Love or not to Love
Seikou no Amaki Daishou
Ecstasy of Killing
Reservoir City
Requiem for the Phantom Part II
Another Canzone of Death
Requiem Last
Koroshi no Perfect Game
Barren Wilderness
Chaser
Requiem for the Phantom part III
Emptiness
Perfect game
Hell of a girl
Watchdog's Oci Ciornie
Yaruse nai Toiki
Whisper of Meadow
Ame no Suteneko
Canzone of Death Part III
Kiyoraka na Kagayaki to Kibou
Knife in the Bathtub (Bathtub no Naka no Knife)
Stranger in the Home
Bourei
Canzone of Death Part I
KARMA (TV Edit) perf. KOKIA
Jigoku no Mon  (地獄の門?, "Hell's Gate" - TV Edit) Ali Project

Volume 2
Catastrophe (カタストロフ)
Phantom Children A (ファントムチルドレンA)
Haste and pursuit version
Battle of crimson
Nichijou no Hitokoma (日常のひとこま)
Seijaku to Kyoufu (静寂と恐怖)
Lizzie Betsuri (リズィ別離)
Canzone of Heart
Nostalgic
Kako Kara no Sasoi (過去からの誘い)
Cal (キャル)
Canzone of choir
air&suspisoin
Requiem cello
Canzone of voice
Requiem
Whisper of meadow partII
Discover
Superstar (written by Tatsuya Kato)
Snake Head (スネークヘッド)
Phantom Children B (ファントムチルドレンB)
kazoku - Phantom (家族___Phantom)
Amai Seikatsu A (甘い生活A)
Amai Seikatsu B (甘い生活B)
Koukou 2nensei (高校2年生)
Jingi 1 (仁義1)
Jingi 2 (仁義2)
Nanji, Unmei wo Shiru (汝、運命を知る)
Mio (美緒)
Modae (悶え)
Neutral Kara Ecstasy (ニュートラルからエクスタシー)
Kiyoraka na Owari (清らかな終わり)
Nichijou Kara Suspense he (日常からサスペンスへ)
Namida Kara Shinkoku he (涙から深刻へ)
Catch001
Catch002
Catch003
Catch004
CORD001
CORD002
CORD003
Senritsu no Kodomotachi (戦慄の子供たち) (TV Edit) ALI PROJECT
Transparent (TV Edit) KOKIA

References
General

Specific

Phantom ~Requiem for the Phantom~
Bee Train Production